Tum Hi Aana is an Indian Hindi-language song from the soundtrack of the Indian feature film, Marjaavaan (2019). The pop ballad was released by major Indian label T-Series on 3 October 2019 as a single from the soundtrack. It was composed by Payal Dev, written by Kunaal Verma, and sung by Jubin Nautiyal. The melody of the song occurred to Dev, while she was working on a different track.

The song received positive reviews from film critics, the majority of whom complimented its composition. The song peaked at number one and two on the Official Charts Company Asian Music Charts and The Times of India Mirchi Top 20 Chart, respectively. The music video features Sidharth Malhotra and Tara Sutaria reprising their characters in Marjaavaan.

Background and composition 

Indian music composer Payal Dev described her composition for "Tum Hi Aana" as follows:

After recording the melody, Kunal Verma instantly wrote "some lines", claimed Dev. The singer Jubin Nautiyal, who was also present, "instantly loved it and accepted to record a scratch of the song". Nautiyal said that the record label T-Series also loved the song. "Tum Hi Aana" was suggested to the director Milap Zaveri by the director of T-Series, Bhushan Kumar, when the latter was narrating the script of Marjaavaan. Furthermore, Zaveri said, "Bhushan Kumar made me listen to the scratch and I was immediately sold on it. I couldn't have asked for a better song to describe the situation". "Tum Hi Aana" was written by Verma and performed by Nautiyal.

Dev originally composed the song as a "romantic" track, but had to change the composition due to the film's romantic and sad theme. The lyrics were also altered to suit the theme. Dev used multiple instruments for her composition, including the sarangi, flute, piano, and mouth organ, "to give it the right amount of emotions". The song was called a pop ballad in press reviews. Milap Zaveri described the song as being  "all about emotions, passion and heartbreak". The director compared the song with other tracks, saying "It's on the lines of "Bekhayali" and "Galliyan" from the films Kabir Singh and Ek Villain, respectively".

Release and reception 
The single version of "Tum Hi Aana" was released on 3 October 2019, for digital download by the record label Super Cassettes Industries Private Limited (T-Series). The happy, sad, and duet versions were all released on 27 November 2019 through the aforementioned label.

"Tum Hi Aana" was met with positive reviews from film critics. The staff of Asian News International wrote that the song will "tug your heartstrings as it is all about emotions and heartbreak". Abhishek Singh, writing for The Indian Express, expressed that the song "can be a bit much with how sad it is" but in the verdict, he wrote "[the song] is worth listening to at least once. If you’re into it, you’ll probably end up having it on repeat". Devarsi Ghosh of Scroll.in said that the song is "fabulous" and praised Nautiyal, stating that: "It is undoubtedly the best composition Nautiyal has sung till date". The staff of The Times of India praised the song, writing that it will "make you teary-eyed for sure". The staff from Koimoi praised the composer, "Dev has done the music composition really well and the symphony at the back mixed with flutes tunes is absolutely mellow to the ears".

Times Now's Gaurang Chauhan claimed that, "The melodious tune and Jubin's soothing voice will instantly transport you back to the good old days of the 90s". The staff of Indian magazine Outlook cited the song for having "won acclaim and popularity" for Dev. News18's staff wrote, "The soulful romantic number Tum Hi Aana is a tear-jerker, to say the least". Rafat Sami from the Glamsham regarded, "Verma's lyrics, though filmy, touch the heart and are simple and relatable". Keyur Seta of Cinestaan believed that the song is "Motif" throughout Marjaavaan. DJ Munks from BizAsia wrote that, " [the song] does have a very deeply moving and soulful instrumentation that makes this a gorgeous melody to listen to".

Music video 

The music video was released on 2 October 2019 to YouTube. Zoya (Tara Sutaria) plays a mute character alongside Raghu (Sidharth Malhotra) in Marjaavaan, a goon who falls in love with her. Within the film Raghu is a loyal goon to the local thug Narayan Anna (Nassar), who orders Raghu to kill Zoya, not knowing that Raghu loves her because she was an eyewitness of a crime that Narayan Anna's son Vishnu Riteish Deshmukh committed. In the music video for "Tum Hi Aana", Raghu is sentenced to jail for murdering Zoya and reminisces about his dead lover. Two days after its release, "Tum Hi Aana" crossed over 14 million views on YouTube. Within a few weeks, the song had received over 50 million views on YouTube.

Commercial performance 
"Tum Hi Aana" debuted and peaked at number one on the Official Charts Company Asian Music Charts and spent a total of 30 weeks on the chart. The song reached number two on The Times of India Mirchi Top 20, where it spent a total of nine weeks on the chart.

Charts

Credits and personnel 
Credits adapted from YouTube.

 Jubin Nautiyal – lead vocals
 Payal Dev – music
 Kunal Verma – lyrics
 Aditya Dev – music producer

Track listings

Release history

Lyrics 

तेरे जाने का गाम

और ना आने का गम

फ़िर जमाने का गाम
क्या करें

राह देखे नज़र

रात भर जाग कर

पर तेरी तो खबर ना मिले

बहुत आई गई यादें

मगर इस बार तुम ही आना

इरादे फिर से जाने के नहीं लाना

तुम ही आना

मेरी देहलीज से होकर

बहारें जब गुजराती है

यहाँ क्या धूप क्या सावन

हवाएं भी बरसात है

हमें पुछों क्या होता है

बिना दिल के जाने जाना

बहुत आई गई यादें

मगर इस बार तुम ही आना

ओह ओह ....

कोई तो राह वो होगी

जो मेरे घर को आती है

करो पीछा सदा उन का

सुनो क्या कहना चाहता है

तुम आओगे मुझे मिलने

खबर ये भी तुम ही लाना

बहुत आई गई यादें

मगर इस बार तुम ही आना

मरजावां...

Tere Jaane Ka Gam

Aur Na Aane Ka Gam

Phir Zamaane Ka Gam

Kya Karein

Raah Dekhe Nazar

Raat Bhar Jaag Kar

Par Teri Toh Khabar Na Mile

Bahot Aayi Gayi Yaadein

Magar Iss Baar Tum Hi Aana

Iraade Fir Se Jaane Ke Nahi Laana

Tum Hi Aana

Meri Dehleez Se Hokar

Bahaarein Jab Gujarti Hai

Yahan Kya Dhup Kya Saawan

Hawayein Bhi Barashti Hai

Hume Puchhon Kya Hota Hai

Bina Dil Ke Jiye Jaana

Bahot Aayi Gayi Yaadein

Magar Iss Baar Tum Hi Aana

Oh Ooo....

Koyi Toh Raah Woh Hogi

Jo Mere Ghar Ko Aati Hai

Karo Peechha Sada Unn Ka

Suno Kya Kehna Chaahti Hai

Tum Aoge Mujhe Milne

Khabar Ye Bhi Tum Hi Laana

Bahot Aayi Gayi Yaadein

Magar Iss Baar Tum Hi Aana

Marjaavaan...

References

External links 
 

2010s ballads
2019 songs
Hindi film songs
Indian songs
Jubin Nautiyal songs
Pop ballads
Songs written for films